Larry Crow (born December 1959) is an American politician from the state of Florida.

Crow previously served in the Florida House of Representatives from 1995 to 2003. He currently lives in Palm Harbor, Florida with his family.

He received his bachelor's degree from the University of South Florida, and his J.D. from the University of Florida.

His affiliations while he served include the following: St. Petersburg Young Republicans (Past member from 1979 to 1982); Pinellas County Republican Executive Committee (1979-1980); Tarpon Springs Chamber of Commerce (Past member and board member); Tarpons Springs Kiwanis Club; Helen Ellis Memorial Hospital Planned Giving (committee past member).

References

External links
Official Website of Larry Crow

University of Florida alumni
Republican Party members of the Florida House of Representatives
People from Palm Harbor, Florida
Politicians from St. Petersburg, Florida
1959 births
Living people